Komi is a small village and a community on the island of Tinos, a Cycladic island in Greece. The community consists of the settlements Kolympithra, Krokos, Komi, Perastra and Skalados. Its population was 318 at the 2011 census. It has a Catholic church, and offers Cycladic type architecture. Every year, on August 29, a big party is held there, with visitors from various parts of Greece and even foreigners.

References

External links
Photo from Komi

Tinos
Villages in Greece